Formula One 2000 is a racing video game developed by Studio 33 for the PlayStation version and Tarantula Studios for the Game Boy Color version and published by Midway Games in North America and SCEE in Europe for PlayStation and Game Boy Color. It is a sequel to the 1999 video game Formula One 99 and was based on the 2000 Formula One World Championship.

Gameplay 
Formula One 2000 features 17 Grand Prix circuits, and a new "arcade" mode. This arcade mode seemed more similar in style to WipEout - tracks were grouped into "location zones" with futuristic-sounding names and cars were grouped into series. The player began on the easier courses with the worst cars, before unlocking the more difficult courses and the better cars. Bonus images could be unlocked as an incentive to win races. It also features the new Indianapolis Motor Speedway.

Strangely, despite Monza's layout being modified for 2000, its previous layout is still used.

Alcohol and tobacco-related sponsors
All alcohol and tobacco sponsors are censored:
 Ferrari's Marlboro is completely censored.
 Jaguar's Beck's is replaced by "Best's".
 Jordan's Benson & Hedges is replaced by "Buzzin' Hornets".
 Benetton's Mild Seven is replaced by "Benetton" (as in real life).
 McLaren's West is replaced by "Mika" and "David" (as in real life).
 Prost's Gauloises is replaced by a "bar code".
 BAR's Lucky Strike is replaced by "Look Alike" (with the logo blocked out).

References

External links
 

2000 video games
Formula One video games
Game Boy Color games
Midway video games
Multiplayer and single-player video games
PlayStation (console) games
Sony Interactive Entertainment games
Take-Two Interactive games
Video game sequels
Video games developed in the United Kingdom
Video games set in Australia
Video games set in Austria
Video games set in Malaysia
Video games set in Brazil
Video games set in Spain
Video games set in Monaco
Video games set in Canada
Video games set in France
Video games set in the United Kingdom
Video games set in Germany
Video games set in Hungary
Video games set in Belgium
Video games set in Italy
Video games set in Indiana
Video games set in Japan